2013 Cambodian League is the 29th season of the Cambodian League. A total of 10 teams are competing in the league.

The regular season will be played from January 12 to June 2 and will once again feature playoffs at the end of the season to determine the league champions. The season has been brought forward by 2 months.

Teams 
 Boeung Ket Rubber Field
 Build Bright United
 Asia Europe University
 Kirivong Sok Sen Chey
 Nagacorp FC
 National Defense Ministry
 Phnom Penh Crown
 National Police Commissary
 Svay Rieng
 Senate Secretariat

Personnel and sponsoring

Foreign players
The number of foreign players is restricted to five per team. A team can use three foreign players on the field in each game.

Venues

League table

Playoffs

Semi-finals

3rd place

Final

Champions qualify to 2014 AFC President's Cup.

Promotion-relegation playoff

Top scorers

Awards

References

C-League seasons
Cambodia
Cambodia
1